Alfred Ely Beach High School, known as Beach High School,  is one of the oldest public high schools in Savannah, Georgia, United States.

History
In 1867, the Beach Institute was established by the Freedmen's Bureau with funds donated by Alfred Ely Beach, editor of Scientific American. The school was privately funded as a manual training school to provide support for newly freed African Americans. By 1874, the institute was appropriated by the Savannah-Chatham Board of Education for the purpose of providing free education to Savannah's African American citizenry. Although the Beach Institute closed its doors in 1915, it was reopened as an African American cultural center and is currently operated by the King-Tisdell Cottage Foundation. The Beach name survives in the name of Alfred E. Beach High School.

In 2010, Beach High School was selected as the recipient of "Outstanding Service By a High School" at the 38th annual Jefferson Awards, an honor for community service and volunteerism.

At the end of the 2009–2010 academic year, the Savannah-Chatham County School District released the school's faculty and staff personnel, citing inadequate academic progress over the previous five years.

Enrollment
Beach High is open to residents of Chatham County in grades 9th through 12th.

Academics

Beach High students undertake a college preparatory curriculum that includes four years of English, history, and laboratory-based sciences (chemistry and physics are required); three years of mathematics (most students opt for four) and foreign language; a semester each of introductory art, music, health, and computer science; and two lab-based technology courses. It offers students a broad selection of elective courses.

Beach offers one of district's two allied health programs. Its also offers an Army Junior ROTC pathway with a full four year curriculum for both programs. Students who complete this program. The Allied Health Professions program partners with Memorial Health University Medical Center and CVS Pharmacy to provide internships for Beach High students.

College preparatory
Accelerated students are also able to dual enroll with a local college offering college credit towards a degree.

Special education
The school has special education programs for the following areas:
 Learning disabled
 Behavior disorder
 Moderately intellectually handicapped
 Mildly intellectually handicapped
 Severely intellectually handicapped
 Profoundly intellectually handicapped

Extracurricular activities

State championships

Georgia Interscholastic Association
The school won the boys' state basketball championship in 1953, 1963, 1964, and 1965.

Georgia High School Association
The school won a boys' state basketball championship in 1967 (the first year that African-Americans were allowed to play in the Georgia High School Association) under coach Russell Ellington. The girls' basketball team won a state championship in 2000 and 2017.

Notable alumni

See also
Buildings in Savannah Historic District

References

External links 

Savannah-Chatnam County Public School System website

Educational institutions established in 1867
Public high schools in Georgia (U.S. state)
Beach family
Schools in Savannah, Georgia
Schools supported by the Freedmen's Bureau
1867 establishments in Georgia (U.S. state)
Savannah Historic District